The 1998 Giro d'Italia was the 81st edition of the Giro d'Italia, one of cycling's Grand Tours. The Giro began in Nice, France, with a Prologue individual time trial on 16 May, and Stage 12 occurred on 28 May with a stage from San Marino. The race finished in Milan on 7 June.

Stage 12
28 May 1998 — San Marino to Carpi,

Stage 13
29 May 1998 — Carpi to Schio,

Stage 14
30 May 1998 — Schio to Piancavallo,

Stage 15
31 May 1998 — Trieste to Trieste,  (ITT)

Stage 16
1 June 1998 — Udine to Asiago,

Stage 17
2 June 1998 — Asiago to Sëlva,

Stage 18
3 June 1998 — Sëlva to Passo di Pampeago,

Stage 19
4 June 1998 — Cavalese to Plan di Montecampione,

Stage 20
5 June 1998 — Darfo Boario Terme to Mendrisio,

Stage 21
6 June 1998 — Mendrisio to Lugano,  (ITT)

Stage 22
7 June 1998 — Lugano to Milan,

References

1998 Giro d'Italia
Giro d'Italia stages